Haldensee is a lake of Tyrol, Austria. It is located on an altitude of 1124 m ü.

See also
 

Lakes of Tyrol (state)